Lucernariidae is a family of stalked jellyfish containing two genera.

Species
Genus Lucernaria O. F. Müller, 1776
 Lucernaria australis Vanhöffen, 1908
 Lucernaria bathyphila Haeckel, 1880
 Lucernaria haeckeli (Antipa, 1892)
 Lucernaria infundibulum Haeckel, 1880
 Lucernaria janetae Collins & Daly, 2005
 Lucernaria quadricornis O. F. Müller, 1776
 Lucernaria sainthilairei (Redikorzev, 1925)
 Lucernaria walteri (Antipa, 1892)
Genus Stylocoronella Salvini-Plawen, 1966 
 Stylocoronella riedli Salvini-Plawen, 1966
 Stylocoronella variabilis Salvini-Plawen, 1987

References

External links

 Lucernariidae on World Register of Marine Species

 
Myostaurida
Cnidarian families